In 1904, the Imperial and Royal Ministry of Justice (k. u. k. Justizministerium) published the following list of games prohibited in Austria-Hungary. It was expanded by the state of Austria in 1933, was exemplary in Austria for many years and now represents a culturally and historically interesting list of the sort of gambling that was popular at that time.

It is particularly noteworthy that there are also some bowling and billiard games on this list, which today are regarded more as games of skill.

List of prohibited games (1904) 
On 30 June 1904 a law was passed by the Ministry of Justice of the Empire of Austria-Hungary which designated the following games as "prohibited games":

	Pharao
	Paschen (dice game)
	Einundzwanzig (Twenty-One) and the similar Halbzwölf
	Zwicken (also Labet, Tippen, Pochen) and its variant, Kleinpréférence
	Angehen (also called Frische Vier)
	Bakkarat (Makao)
	Tartel with open Terzen
	Kartentombola (also Grüne Wiese)
	Stoß (Naschi-Waschi, also Meine Tante – Deine Tante)
	Poker
	Färbeln
	Roulette and the similar Wettrennspiel
	Booky or Sixer Domino
	Polnische Bank (Panczok, Mauscheln)
	Farbenbank
	Stoßpudelspiel
	Lampeln
	Die heilige Wahrheit or Herzaß
	Bauernschreck or "The Red One Wins" (die Rote gewinnt)
	the skittles game of Halbzwölf
       the skittles game of Schanzeln

The following were also classed as prohibited games:

Chemin de fer, Rouge et noir, Trente et quarante, Trente et un, Vingt et un, Feuer, Belle (with boards and numbers), Billardquartscheiben, Biribi or Cavagnole, Elf hoch (with 3 dice), Esperanz (with 2 dice), Fräulein Tini, Häufeln, Grad – Ungrad, Kreiselspiel or Diplomat (with 9 skittles and a spinning top).

List of prohibited games (1933)
On 2 January 1933, Austria confirmed and extended the list of banned games as follows: 
(The changes from the 1904 list are shown in italics.)
	Pharao
	Dice games
	Einundzwanzig and the similar Halbzwölf
	Zwicken (also Labet, Tippen, Pochen, Dreiblatt) and its variant, Kleinpreference
	Angehen (frische Vier)
	Bakkarat (Makao)
	Tartl with open Terzen
	Kartentombola (also grüne Wiese) and its variant "Gottes Segen bei Kohn"
	Stoß (Naschi-Waschi, also Meine Tante – Deine Tante)
	Poker
	Färbeln
	Roulette and all roulette-like games, especially Pferdchen – or Wettrennspiel, Dreikugelspiel, Deltaspiel, Uranusspiel, Troulaspiel, Kartenroulette, Astroulette, Germaniaspiel, Spiralospiel, Habilisspiel, Beobaspiel, Pedegespiel, Hansaspiel, Atlantikspiel, Roulyspiel, Visiblaspiel, Bäderspiel, Ballaspiel and Laboulespiel
	Booky or Sixer Domino
	Polnische Bank (Panczok, Wick, Mauscheln)
	Farbenbank
	Stoßpudelspiel
	Lampeln
	Die heilige Wahrheit or Herzas
	"The Red One Wins", also called Kümmelblättchen
	Jouettespiel
	Glücksrad
	Balanceleiterspiel
	Games with gaming machines, unless they have a certificate issued by the Federal Ministry of Finance that the activity constitutes a game of skill.

References 

Lists of games
Gambling games